BBC Two Scotland was the national variation of BBC Two for BBC Scotland. It was broadcast via digital television and was the sister Scottish channel of BBC One Scotland and Gaelic-language BBC Alba. Unlike BBC One Scotland, which broadcasts its own continuity with only rare exceptions, BBC Two Scotland would opt in and out of BBC Two network continuity throughout the day.

History
Prior to digital switchover, 'BBC Two Scotland' and 'BBC Two Scotland (Digital)' were listed as separate channels by some guides, but were effectively the same channel, broadcasting identical feeds as part of the transition to digital television.

On 24 February 2019, the BBC launched the BBC Scotland channel, a new autonomous service that broadcasts a nightly lineup of Scottish programming. In preparation for its launch, BBC Two Scotland was discontinued and replaced by the national version beginning 18 February. BBC Scotland officially broadcasts from 19:00 to 00:00 nightly, but simulcasts BBC Two daily from 12:00 to 19:00, and may opt out for sport and political broadcasts of regional interest during this period. BBC Two Scotland remained on the Sky EPG on channel 970 until 28 February 2019. From 18 to 27 February 2019, BBC Two Scotland simulcasted BBC Two (England region).

Programming

Similarly to BBC One Scotland, BBC Two Scotland offered differing programming from the UK-wide network specifically aimed at Scottish viewers. Often, this was more specialised programming such as Artworks Scotland, Holyrood Live and the Gaelic strands branded as BBC Two (Dhà) Alba.

During the daytime and overnight schedules, BBC Scotland replaced some of the national education programming for shows better targeted at the separate Scottish education system and replacing some politics strands with coverage of Scottish politics. BBC Sport Scotland would sometimes use BBC Two Scotland to broadcast live coverage of more minority sports, such as athletics and shinty, with some sports such as mountain biking and cross-country showcased in The Adventure Show.

Additionally, on Sunday nights, BBC Two Scotland had become the regular home for Sportscene'''s highlights of the SPFL, preceding Match of the Day 2.

The Music Show was launched on BBC Two Scotland in November 2005, presented by Shantha Roberts. Its programming included live performances from a wide range of musical styles, with bands filmed around the country at different venues and unusual locations, rather than in the studio. Musical styles included indie, jazz, folk, funk, hip hop and electro pop. Its last shows were broadcast in November 2014.

Other examples of BBC Two Scotland programmes include:

 ArtWorks Scotland Cunntas Dè a-nis? Holyrood Live Landward Limmy's Show Na Bleigeardan Newsnight Scotland Daily Politics Scotland Rathad an Sutha Scotland 2016 Sport Nation Sportscene The Adventure Show Wildlife Detectives''

References

External links

1966 establishments in Scotland
BBC Scotland
English-language television stations in the United Kingdom
Television channels and stations established in 1966
Television channels and stations disestablished in 2019
Defunct television channels in Scotland
Defunct BBC television channels
2019 disestablishments in Scotland

pt:BBC Two